2022 Michigan Proposal 2, the Right to Voting Policies Amendment, and also known as Promote the Vote, was a citizen-initiated proposed constitutional amendment in the state of Michigan, which will be voted on as part of the 2022 Michigan elections. The amendment, if passed, will change voting procedures in the state with the goal of making it easier to vote.

Background
Various voting rights advocacy groups gathered 669,972 signatures, enough for the amendment to be placed on the 2022 ballot. On August 31, the Board of State Canvassers, responsible for determining whether candidates and initiatives should be placed on the ballot, deadlocked 2-2, with challengers arguing that the ballot title of the initiative was misleading. On September 9, the Michigan Supreme Court ruled that the initiative should be placed on the November ballot.

Contents
The proposal will appear on the ballot as follows:

Results
Proposal 2 was approved with 59.99% of the vote.

Recount
The America Project, a Donald Trump aligned organization, funded a partial recount of this proposal as well as 2022 Michigan Proposal 3 despite their passage by wide margins.  The recount was spearheaded by Jerome Jay Allen of the conservative group Election Integrity Fund and Force. The recount lasted two weeks and added 14 yes votes and 20 no votes to the totals.  This led to calls to tighten recount rules to disallow frivolous recounts with no chance of changing the vote outcome.

See also
 List of Michigan ballot measures

References

External links

Michigan Proposal 2
Michigan ballot proposals
Proposal 2